Al Hajj Mahmud Kati (or Mahmoud Kati) (1468? - 1552 or 1593) was an African Muslim Songhai scholar. He is traditionally held to be the author of the West African chronicle Tarikh al-fattash, though the authorship is contested.

Kati grew up in Kurmina but lived most of his adult life in Timbuktu. His tomb is the second largest in Timbuktu, after that of Mohammed Bagayogo, and is a site of pilgrimage.

References

1468 births
Year of birth uncertain
16th-century deaths
Year of death unknown
16th-century African people
Historians of Africa
16th-century historians